Md. Mamunur Rashid Kiron is a Bangladesh Awami League politician and the incumbent Member of Parliament from Noakhali-3. He is one of the Director of Globe Pharmaceuticals group of companies Ltd.

Early life
Kiron was born on 20 April 1961. He has B.A. degree.

Career
Kiron was elected to Parliament on 5 January 2014 as a Bangladesh Awami League candidate. He is a Member of the Treasury Bench of the Parliament.

References

Awami League politicians
Living people
1961 births
10th Jatiya Sangsad members
11th Jatiya Sangsad members
People from Begumganj Upazila